The Astronomical Institute of Slovak Academy of Sciences was founded in 1953, when the state observatory on Skalnaté Pleso (founded in 1943 by Dr.
Bečvář) got a status of astronomical institute and became one of the founding institutes of the newly born Slovakian Academy of Sciences. In memories of past and current employees, the institute and the observatory on Skalnaté Pleso were always blended in one and therefore one could consider for the year of the institute foundation already the 1943. Currently, it has its headquarters at Tatranská Lomnica.

Field of research and organization of the institute

The institute focuses its research on the Sun, interplanetary matter (comets, meteoroids, asteroids) and on astrophysical research of variable and chemically peculiar stars. It has about 65 permanent employees of which roughly 50 are active researchers. It is divided into 3 departments:

Department of Solar Physics
Interest in solar atmospheric activity led the department to focus on many processes in the solar photosphere, chromosphere and corona based on spectral line analysis using observational data from the
Vacuum Tower Telescope (VTT) on Tenerife and utilization of data from Solar and Heliospheric Observatory (SOHO), including their own coronal observations. The head of the department is Aleš Kučera.

Department of Interplanetary Matter
Research employs photometry and astrometry of asteroids and comets using the main telescope of Skalnaté Pleso observatory. Furthermore, fish-eye cameras are used to detect bolides on the sky. The head of the department is Ján Svoreň.

Stellar Physics Department
This department is focused on binary and multiple stellar systems. Its research employs spectroscopy and utilization of synthetic spectra and stellar databases from space-based observatories like HST, Hipparcos and the TYCHO catalogues. The head of the department is Drahomír Chochol.

Facilities of the Institute
The institute has mountain observatories at Skalnaté Pleso, Lomnický štít and a theoretical department in Bratislava (founded in 1955), which is a statewide coordinating body for research of interplanetary matter. Moreover, it runs several full-sky photographic chambers (bolide cameras) which are part of European bolide network.

The astronomical observatory at Skalnaté Pleso (1783 m) was founded in 1943. It is equipped with a 61 cm astrometrical and photometric reflector with a CCD camera and a 60 cm photometric reflector. The astronomical station on Lomnický štít (2632 m) has been active since 1960. It is equipped with a 20 cm coronograph and a spectrograph. In the headquarters of the astronomical institute at Tatranská Lomnica a 60 cm reflector and a solar horizontal spectrograph are located.

Directors of the institute 

 Antonín Bečvář (1943–1950)
 V. Guth (1951–1956)
 Záviš Bochníček (1956–1958)
 Ľudmila Pajdušáková (1958–1979)
 Július Sýkora (1979–1989)
 Ján Štohl (1989–1993)
 Juraj Zverko (1993–2001)
 Ján Svoreň (2001–2009)
 Aleš Kučera (2009–)

Highlights of the institute
The astronomical institute participated on discoveries of the following comets:

Five astronomers participated in the discoveries: Antonín Mrkos, Ľudmila Pajdušáková, Ľubor Kresák, Antonín Bečvář and Margita Kresáková. From 70 comets discovered worldwide between 1946–1959, 18 were discovered from the observatories at Skalnaté Pleso and Lomnický štít.

See also
 Astronomical Institute of Czech Academy of Sciences
 Ondřejov Observatory
 Institute of physics of the University of Pavol Jozef Šafárik

References

External links
Official webpage of the astronomical institute

Astronomical observatories in Slovakia
Education in Slovakia
Slovak Academy of Sciences
1953 establishments in Czechoslovakia
Research institutes established in 1953
Astronomy in Czechoslovakia